List of governments of Slovenia:

Slovenian politicians
Government of Slovenia
Lists of Slovenian politicians